Francisco Javier Cañete Ramírez (born 5 November 1976) is a Chilean former footballer who played for Chilean clubs Colo-Colo (1994–1997), Santiago Morning (1998–2002), Cobresal (2003), Unión La Calera (2004), La Serena (2005) and Everton (2005).

References 

1976 births
Living people
Chilean footballers
Cobresal footballers
Colo-Colo footballers
Unión La Calera footballers
Santiago Morning footballers
Everton de Viña del Mar footballers
Chilean Primera División players
Primera B de Chile players

Association footballers not categorized by position